Mumtaz Mahal is an album by American blues artist Taj Mahal, N. Ravikiran and Vishwa Mohan Bhatt.

Track listing
 "Coming of the Mandinka"
 "Come On in My Kitchen"
 "Rolling on the Sea"
 "Mary Don't You Weep"
 "Stand by Me"
 "Johnny Too Bad"
 "Curry and Quartertones"

Personnel
Taj Mahal - guitar, vocals
Vishna Mohan Bhatt - guitar (mohan veena)
N. Ravikiran - lute (chitravina)

References

1995 albums
Taj Mahal (musician) albums
Water Lily Acoustics albums